Cass Jackson is a former American football coach and player. Hired in 1973 to become the head football coach at Oberlin College in Oberlin, Ohio, he became one of the first African-American head football coaches at a predominantly white college. Jackson later served as the head coach at Morris Brown College from 1976 to 1977 and at Southern University in Baton Rouge, Louisiana from 1978 to 1980. He played college football at San Jose State University, where he was a running back on the 1962 and 1963 teams.

Head coaching record

References

Year of birth missing (living people)
Living people
American football halfbacks
Oberlin Yeomen football coaches
Morris Brown Wolverines football coaches
San Jose State Spartans football coaches
San Jose State Spartans football players
Southern Jaguars football coaches
African-American coaches of American football
African-American players of American football
21st-century African-American people